Conospermum taxifolium, commonly known as variable smoke-bush, yew-leaf smoke bush or paint brush, is a plant in the family Proteaceae and is endemic to eastern Australia. It is an erect shrub with narrow elliptic to narrow egg-shaped leaves with the narrower end towards the base and panicles of cream-coloured to white, tube-shaped flowers.

Description
The upper lip of the flower is sac-like and the lower lip has three lobes.

Taxonomy
Conospermum taxifolium was first formally described in 1807 by Karl Friedrich von Gaertner in Joseph Gaertner's book, Supplementum Carpologicae.

Distribution and habitat
Variable smoke-bush grows in heath and woodland on the coast and nearby ranges, sometimes further inland, and is widespread from southern Queensland through eastern New South Wales to the far eastern corner of Victoria.

References

External links
 

taxifolium
Flora of New South Wales
Flora of Queensland
Taxa named by Karl Friedrich von Gaertner